Driven to Destruction may refer to:

 Test Drive: Eve of Destruction, a 2004 racing game by the American video games studio Monster Games known in Europe as Driven to Destruction
 "Driven to Destruction", a song by the Polish band Riverside from the 2009 album Anno Domini High Definition
 "Driven to Destruction", a song by Send More Paramedics from the 2004 album The Hallowed and the Heathen
 "Driven to Destruction", a 2016 episode of MythBusters